In mathematics, the amoeba order is the partial order of open subsets of 2ω of measure less than 1/2, ordered by reverse inclusion. Amoeba forcing is forcing with the amoeba order; it adds a measure 1 set of random reals. 

There are several variations, where 2ω is replaced by the real numbers or a real vector space or the unit interval, and the number 1/2 is replaced by some positive number ε.

The name "amoeba order" come from the fact that a subset in the amoeba order can "engulf" a measure zero set by extending a "pseudopod" to form a larger subset in the order containing this measure zero set, which is analogous to the way an amoeba eats food.

The amoeba order satisfies the countable chain condition.

References

Order theory
Forcing (mathematics)